Przyjaźń  (csb. Przëjazniô, de. Rheinfeld) is a village in the gmina of Żukowo, within Kartuzy County, Pomeranian Voivodeship, in northern Poland.

For details of the history of the region, see History of Pomerania.

The village has a population of 1,206.

References

Villages in Kartuzy County